Mark Walker may refer to:

Politics and law
 Mark L. Walker (born 1941), member of the Illinois House of Representatives
 Mark Walker (North Carolina politician) (born 1969), minister and U.S. House of Representatives member for North Carolina's 6th District
 Mark W. Walker, member of the Utah House of Representatives
 Mark E. Walker (born 1967), United States federal judge in Florida

Other
 Mark Walker (British Army officer)  (1827–1902), Irish recipient of the Victoria Cross
 Mark Walker (entertainer), British cabaret and musical theatre entertainer; regular cast member of 1980s TV show, The Laughter Show
 Mark Walker (songwriter) (1846–1924), fisherman and songwriter
 Mark Alan Walker, professor of philosophy at New Mexico State University
 Mark H. Walker, writer and board wargame designer